Rabaul is a town in eastern New Britain, Papua New Guinea. Japanese forces landed on Rabaul on 23 January 1942, capturing it by February 1942. The former Australian territory was transformed into a major Japanese naval and air installation. The Japanese heavily relied on it, using it as a launching point for Japanese reinforcements to New Guinea and Guadalcanal. Throughout the Solomon Islands campaign, neutralizing Rabaul became the primary objective of the Allied effort in the Solomons.

Background
After its capture by the South Seas Force in February 1942, Rabaul was developed into a major fleet base by the Japanese, eventually becoming the most heavily defended Japanese position in the South Pacific. Rabaul's strategic location, multiple airfields and large natural harbor made it the ideal staging base for ships, aircraft, troops and supplies during the New Guinea and Guadalcanal campaigns. The Japanese army dug many kilometers of tunnels as shelter from Allied air attacks. They also expanded the facilities by constructing army barracks and support structures. By 1943 there were about 110,000 Japanese troops based in Rabaul.

After the Japanese lost their hold on Guadalcanal in early 1943, Allied forces began the push up the Solomon Islands towards Rabaul. Marine Raiders and United States Army troops landed in the Russell Islands shortly after, and an airbase was established there. U.S. forces then pushed the Japanese out of the New Georgia Islands in August 1943. The Japanese command had invested men and supplies into building an airfield at Munda, all of which proved to be a waste. The U.S. Fifth Air Force aircraft made small attacks in October, and a major Allied air raid on Rabaul took place on 3 November. This raid destroyed 52 Japanese aircraft and five warships. Starting on 1 November, U.S. Marines began landing at Cape Torokina, on Bougainville, where several airfields were constructed by Allied forces. Most of Japan's warships were withdrawn by 6 November. 

With the major Japanese possessions around Rabaul captured, Allied air forces could then begin the permanent neutralization of Rabaul. And as part of efforts to isolate the Rabaul base, U.S. Army troops landed at Arawe on Western New Britain on 15 December, and the 1st Marine Division landed at Cape Gloucester on 26 December 1943.

Early air attacks
As the major Japanese fleet base in the South Pacific, Rabaul had been under continuous Allied air attack since the first raid by Royal Australian Air Force (RAAF) Catalinas in January 1942. However a lack of resources and the enormous distances involved (Rabaul was 500 miles from the nearest RAAF airfield at Port Moresby) ensured that these attacks remained small and sporadic for nearly two years.

October – November 1943 bombing raids

As a part of Operation Cartwheel the U.S. Fifth Air Force, the Royal Australian Air Force and the Royal New Zealand Air Force (RNAF), all under the command of U.S. General George Kenney, began a sustained bombing campaign against the airfields and port of Rabaul in late 1943. The initial mission was delivered by 349 aircraft on 12 October 1943, but it could not be followed up immediately because of bad weather. A single raid by 50 B-25 Mitchell medium bombers reached the target on 18 October. Sustained attacks resumed on 23 October, culminating in a large raid on 2 November.

After the first Japanese attempt to repel the Allied amphibious invasion of Bougainville was thwarted by the United States Navy surface forces at the Battle of Empress Augusta Bay, the Imperial Japanese Navy sent a large naval force from Truk to Rabaul for a second attempt. These attacks succeeded in damaging six of the seven Japanese cruisers present in Simpson Harbour, ending the Japanese threat to the Bougainville landings. A following raid on 11 November including the three carriers of Task Group 50.3 commanded by Rear Admiral Alfred E. Montgomery inflicted additional damage on the light cruiser  and shot down 35 Japanese aircraft.

Pacification campaign

The capture of Bougainville and Buka brought Rabaul within range of land-based U.S. Navy and Marine Corps tactical bombers, setting the stage for the pacification campaign to follow. Rather than attempt to capture the heavily fortified position, the Allies determined to neutralize Rabaul by isolating it and eliminating its airpower. The first air attack in the pacification campaign was planned for 17 December 1943. It would be based out of Torokina Airfield on Bougainville and consisted of 31 Marine F4U Corsairs, 23 RNZAF P-40 fighters, 22 U.S. Navy F6F Hellcats, and a slightly smaller number of Army Air Forces B-24 bombers. The attack did not receive a large response from the Japanese, so only seven Japanese fighters were lost. Three RNZAF P-40s were lost, two with their pilots. A similar attack took place on 19 December, which cost the Japanese four aircraft, two credited to Marine fighters.

The first "large scale" strike took place on 23 December. Different from previous strikes, the Army Air Forces bombers went in first, and the fighters followed afterwards. Forty Japanese fighters responded this time, with thirty claimed to be destroyed by Allied fighters, though Japanese records do not match the Allied claims. Following another raid on Christmas Eve, U.S. Navy carriers attacked the Japanese force at Kavieng, New Ireland in unison with an air raid on Rabaul. The Navy carriers returned to Kavieng on 1 January 1944.

Throughout January 1944, the Japanese command devoted valuable carrier aircraft and carrier pilots to the defense of Rabaul. The seemingly hopeless situation in which the Japanese pilots were being fed into was nicknamed "the sinkhole in the Bismarcks," or the "Bismarcks sinkhole." January proved costly for the Japanese: 266 fighters were credited to U.S. Marine Corps fighters and bomber gunners alone, not including the physical damage done to Rabaul's land defenses. In February, the Japanese command decided to pull all remaining Japanese airmen and their crews from Rabaul. Between 70 and 120 Japanese aircraft flew from Rabaul to Truk (which had recently been raided by U.S. Navy carrier aircraft) on the morning of 19 February. Their valuable mechanics attempted to leave Rabaul by ship on 21 February, but their ship, the Kokai Maru, was sunk by Allied bombers. This marked the end of Japanese air resistance to Allied planes over Rabaul.

Aftermath

With Rabaul's offensive capabilities neutralized, the Allies decided to forgo a ground assault, electing instead to reinforce their foothold on the southern coast of New Britain against any potential Japanese counter-attack while allowing the Rabaul garrison to "wither on the vine." Allied fighters and bombers continued to attack Rabaul through 1944 and 1945. The regular attacks became known as "milk runs" among the Allied air crews. The only opposition over Rabaul was anti-aircraft fire, so attacking became a normalcy for Allied airmen and their maintenance crews. Eventually Allied forces came to use Rabaul as a live-fire exercise to give aircrew some taste of combat before committing them elsewhere in the theater.

The neutralization of Rabaul was ultimately a disaster for the Japanese. Most of their experienced carrier pilots were lost over Rabaul, large numbers of their sorely needed aviation maintenance personnel were either lost during their attempted evacuation or trapped there, and the Japanese no longer had a base from which they could threaten the Allied presence in the Solomons. By isolating Rabaul, the Allies effectively made its large garrison (which outnumbered the defenders on Okinawa) prisoners of war without having to fight them. The last Allied airstrike on Rabaul took place on 8 August 1945, only weeks before the Japanese surrender.

Notes

References 
:

Rabaul
Rabaul
Rabaul
1943 in Papua New Guinea
1944 in Papua New Guinea
1945 in Papua New Guinea
Pacific Ocean theatre of World War II
Rabaul
Rabaul
Rabaul
Rabaul